We Got It Good and That Ain't Bad: An Ellington Songbook is a 1999 album by André Previn accompanied by bassist David Finck of the music of Duke Ellington.

Reception

The album was reviewed by Michael G. Nastos at Allmusic who wrote that "Previn's technical ability and heartfelt stretching of the original blueprints urge these well-worn tunes to carry new meaning and substance. If there are any stock treatments here, it's because the pianist tends to lay back and let the melodies come to him...Perhaps Previn's voracity is not well known, or as regarded in the modern jazz world as it should be, but on this recording it's clear how great he can be". Nastos concluded that the album was "a step up for the veteran pianist, and is perhaps his shining recorded hour".

Duncan Druce reviewed the album for Gramophone magazine and wrote that Previn and Finck "constantly take over each others' ideas in order to make something different out of them" and praised the "Brilliant, creative playing, then, and wonderful tunes - it's an impressive addition to Previn's enormous discography".

Track listing
 "Take the "A" Train" (Billy Strayhorn) – 5:32
 "Isfahan" (Duke Ellington, Strayhorn) – 4:41
 "I Got It Bad (And That Ain't Good)" (D. Ellington, Paul Francis Webster) – 3:46
 "Do Nothin' Till You Hear From Me" (D. Ellington, Bob Russell) – 6:06
 "Chelsea Bridge" (Strayhorn) – 6:24
 "Things Ain't What They Used To Be" (Mercer Ellington, Ted Persons) – 6:46
 "In a Sentimental Mood" (D. Ellington, Manny Kurtz, Irving Mills) – 5:16
 "Squatty Roo" (Johnny Hodges) – 4:35
 "Come Sunday" (D. Ellington) – 4:31
 "Serenade to Sweden" (D. Ellington) – 6:32
 "I Didn't Know About You" (D. Ellington, Russell) – 6:05
 "In a Mellow Tone" (D. Ellington, Milt Gabler) – 7:44
 "It Don't Mean a Thing (If It Ain't Got That Swing)" (D. Ellington, Mills) – 3:56

Personnel
André Previn – piano
David Finck – double bass

Production
Fred Munzmaier – art direction
John Newton – engineer 
Al Hirschfeld – illustrations
Gene Lees – liner notes
Ellyn Kusmin – producer

References

1999 albums
André Previn albums
Deutsche Grammophon albums
Duke Ellington tribute albums